Krubera Cave (also known as Voronya Cave, sometimes spelled Voronja Cave) is the second-deepest-known cave on Earth, after the Veryovkina Cave. It is located in the Arabika Massif of the Gagra Range of the Western Caucasus, in the Gagra District of Abkhazia, a breakaway region of Georgia.
 
Ukrainian diver Gennadiy Samokhin extended the cave by diving in the terminal sump to 46 metres' depth in 2007 and then to 52 m in 2012, setting successive world records of 2,191 m and 2,197 m, respectively. Krubera is one of the two known caves on Earth deeper than 2,000 metres.

Naming 

Soviet speleologists who explored the cave in the 1960s named it for Russian geographer Alexander Kruber. The alternate name "Voronya Cave", "Crows' Cave" in Russian, was a name given to the cave by Kyiv speleologists during the 1980s, for the crows nesting in the entrance pit.

Location and background 

The Arabika Massif, the home of Krubera (Voronya) Cave, is one of the largest high-mountain limestone karst massifs in the Western Caucasus. It is composed of Lower Cretaceous and Upper Jurassic limestones that dip continuously southwest to the Black Sea and plunge below the modern sea level.
 
To the northwest, north, northeast, and east, Arabika is bordered by the deeply incised canyons of Sandripsh, Kutushara, Gega and Bzyb rivers. The Bzyb River separates Arabika from the adjacent Bzybsky Massif, another outstanding karst area with many deep caves, including the Snezhnaja-Mezhonogo-Iljuzia System and Pantjukhina Cave. To the southwest, Arabika borders the Black Sea.
 
The Arabika Massif has a prominent high central sector with elevations above the tree line at ~. This is an area of classical glaciokarstic landscape, with numerous glacial trough valleys and cirques, with ridges and peaks between them. The highest peak is the Peak of Speleologists but the dominant summit is a typical pyramidal horn of the Arabika Mount. Some middle- to low-altitude ridges covered with forest lie between the central sector and the Black Sea. A plateau-like middle-altitude outlier of the massif in its south sector is Mamzdyshkha, with part of the plateau slightly emerging above the tree line.
 
Among several hundred caves known in the Arabika Massif, fifteen have been explored deeper than 400 m and five deeper than 1,000 m.
 
Krubera Cave is located at 2,256 m above sea level in the Ortobalagan Valley, a perfectly shaped, relatively shallow, glacial trough of the sub-Caucasian stretch, which holds the advanced position in the Arabika's central sector relative to the seashore. Since 1980, Ukrainian cavers have been undertaking systematic efforts in exploring deep caves in the Ortobalagan Valley, resulting in exploration of the Krubera Cave to its current depth and of the surrounding caves, now mostly connected to it. All large caves of the Ortobalagan Valley likely belong to a single hydrological system, connected to large submarine springs at the Black Sea shore.

Geology 

The Ortobalagan Valley extends along the crest of the Berchil'sky anticline, which gently plunges northwest. The cave entrances are aligned along the anticlinal crest (Figure 2) but the caves are controlled by longitudinal, transverse, and oblique fractures and faults and exhibit complex winding patterns in the plan view, remaining largely within and near the anticlinal crest zone. The deep parts of Krubera display a more pervasive conduit pattern with a mixture of phreatic morphology, characteristic of the zone of high-gradient floods, which can be up to 400 m above the low-flow water table, and vadose downcutting elements that are observed even below the water table.
 
The core part of the Arabika Massif is composed of the Upper Jurassic succession resting on the Bajocian Porphyritic Series, which includes sandstones, clays and conglomerates at the top, and tuff, tuffaceous sandstones, conglomerates and breccia, porphyry and lava. The Porphyritic series forms the non-karstic basement of Arabika, which is exposed only on the northern and eastern outskirts, locally in the bottoms of the Kutushara and Gega River valleys. In the central part of Arabika the Cretaceous cover (Valanginian and Hauterivian limestones, marls and sandstones) is retained only in a few ridges and peaks, but it lies intact through the low-altitude ridges to the south-west of the central part. There the Cretaceous succession includes Barremian and Aptian–Cenomanian limestones and marly limestones with abundant concretions of black chert.
 
The Upper Jurassic succession begins with thin-bedded Kimmeridgian–Oxfordian cherty limestones, marls, sandstones and clays, which are identified in the lower part of Krubera Cave. Above lies the thick Tithonian succession of thick-bedded limestones with marly and sandy varieties. Sandy limestones are particularly abundant through the upper 1,000 m sections of deep caves of the Ortobalagan Valley.
 
The tectonic structure of Arabika is dominated by the axis of the large sub-Caucasian anticline (oriented NW–SE), with the gently dipping southwestern mega-flank, complicated by several low-order folds, and steeply dipping northeastern flank (Figure 3). The axis of the anticline roughly coincides with the ridge bordering the Gelgeluk Valley to the north. Located on the southwestern flank of the major anticline is another large one (Berchil'sky), in which the crest is breached by the Ortobalagan Valley. There are several smaller sub-parallel anticlines and synclines farther southwest, between the Berchil' Ridge and the coast.
 
The plicative dislocation structure of the massif is severely complicated by faults, with the fault-block structure strongly controlling both cave development and groundwater flow. Major faults of the sub-Caucasian orientation delineate several large elongated blocks that experienced uplift with different rates during Pliocene and Pleistocene. This had a pronounced effect on the development of deep groundwater circulation and of Krubera Cave in particular. Both longitudinal and transverse faults and related fracture zones play a role in guiding groundwater flow; the latter guide flow across the strike of major plicative dislocations, from the central sector toward the Black Sea.

Cave entrances 
The cave has six entrances, in the gallery below they are arranged by altitude, highest to lowest, after the main one. All are situated above the tree line.

Hydrogeology 
Two more major springs are located in the river canyons bordering Arabika to the east: Goluboe Ozero in the Bzyb canyon (a.s.l.) and Gega waterfall in the Gega canyon (a.s.l.). There are also several smaller springs in the Gagra town.
 
Some boreholes located along the shore of the Black Sea yield karstic groundwater from depths of 40–280 m below sea level. Other much deeper boreholes tapped low-salinity karstic waters at depths of 500 and 1,750 m in the Khashupse Valley near Gantiadi and 2,250 m near Gagra. This suggests the existence of a deep karst system and vigorous karst groundwater circulation at depth.
 
Submarine springs are known in the Arabika area, emerging from the floor of the Black Sea in front of the massif. Shallow springs at depths of 5–7 m can be reached by free dive near Gantiadi. Tamaz Kiknadze (1979) reported submarine springs near the eastern part of Gagra at depth of 25–30 m and Buachidze and Meliva (1967) revealed submarine discharge at depths up to −400 m by hydrochemical profiling. Recently an outstanding feature of the sea floor topography near Arabika has been revealed from a digital bathymetric map that combines depth soundings and high-resolution marine gravity data. It has steep northern and northeastern slopes (on the side of the massif) and gentle south and southwestern slopes. Its formation is apparently karstic. Presently this depression seems to be a focus of submarine discharge of the karst systems of Arabika.
 
The speleological explorations and a series of dye tracing experiments conducted during the 1980s under the coordination of Alexander Klimchouk have radically changed previous notions of the hydrogeology of Arabika, revealed its outstanding speleological perspectives and strongly stimulated further efforts for exploration of deep caves. Tracers injected in the Kujbyshevskaja Cave and the Iljukhina System were detected in the Kholodnaja Rechka and Reprua springs, proving groundwater flow to the south-southwest across major tectonic structures over a distance of 13–16 km as the crow flies (Figure 1). This has been interpreted as an indication of the connection of the cave with the submarine discharge. The large "Central Karst Hydrologic System", which encompasses most of the southeastern flank of the Arabika anticline, had been identified in this way.
 
Another tracer was injected in the Moskovskaja Cave (−970 m) and detected at the Gegsky Vodopad spring, indicating the presence of a karst hydrologic system comprising the northeastern flank of the Arabika anticline (the "Northern System"). No connections have been revealed with yet another major spring, Goluboje Ozero in the Bzyb River canyon, although it apparently drains a large area of the eastern sector of the massif (the hypothetical "Eastern Karst Hydrological System"). It is not clear where Sarma Cave (−1,550 m) drains to, Goluboje Ozero to the southeast or Reprua to the southwest, at the shore.
 
The results of the dye-tracing tests demonstrated that groundwater flow is not subordinate to the fold structure but is largely controlled by faults that cut across the strike of major folds, and that the large part of the central sector of Arabika is hydraulically connected to the springs along the seashore and with submarine discharge points.
 
Krubera Cave has an extremely steep profile and reveals a huge thickness of the vadose zone. Low-TDS groundwater is tapped by boreholes in the shore area at depths of 40–280, 500, 1,750, and 2,250 m below sea level, which suggests the existence of a deep flow system with vigorous flow. Submarine discharge along the Arabika coast is reported at depths up to ~400 m b.s.l.
 
It is difficult to interpret these facts in terms of the development of karst systems controlled by contemporary sea level, or within the range of its Pleistocene fluctuations (up to −150 m). In combination with the existence of the Arabika Submarine Depression, all these facts point to the possibility that karst systems in Arabika could have originated in response to the Messinian salinity crisis (5.96–5.33 Ma) when the Black Sea (Eastern Paratethys) could have almost dried up, as did the adjacent Mediterranean, where the dramatic sea level drop of ~1,500 m is well established.

Biology 

The biocenosis of Krubera-Voronja is composed of more than 12 species of arthropods of several groups, such as pseudoscorpions, spiders, opiliones, crustaceans, springtails, beetles and dipterans. The beetle Catops cavicis inhabits Krubera-Voronja cave and also several caves around the Ortobalagan Valley. The subterranean amphipod crustacean Kruberia abchasica caught by Gennady Samokhin in August 2013, during dives in the siphon 'Dva Kapitana', dwells at the deepest part of the Krubera Cave (at the depth of −2,175 metres).

History of exploration

Early exploration 
At the beginning of the 20th century, Arabika was visited by French speleologist Édouard-Alfred Martel, who published several works about the massif. In 1909–10 Russian karst scientist Alexander Kruber, a founder of the study in Russia, performed some field studies in Arabika. He published his observations in a series of Arabika-specific papers and several monographs. During the subsequent 50 years no special studies were undertaken of the karst and caves in the region, although the karst of Arabika was referred to in many works dealing with regional geology and hydrogeology.

1960s 
In the early 1960s, Georgian geographers led by Levan Maruashvili began exploring caves in the high sector of the massif. Among several other caves, they made the first exploration of an open-mouthed 60 m shaft in the Ortobalagan Valley and named it after Alexander Kruber. The first explorers were stopped by impassable squeezes at −95 m in a meandering passage which led off from the foot of the entrance shaft. The cave remained largely neglected over the next 20 years, although occasionally visited by cavers from various caving clubs. Before 1980 there were no caves deeper than  known in Arabika.

1980s 
The new era in cave explorations in the Arabika Massif began in 1980 when the Kyiv Speleological Club, led by Alexander Klimchouk, started exploring caves there. They adopted an approach to cave search and exploration which included thorough investigations in a defined area and systematic testing of cave limits, through digging in boulder chokes and enlarging squeezes which had previously obstructed exploration. The Ortobalagan Valley had been selected as a primary focus for the Ukrainian efforts. This approach, followed in subsequent years by other caving clubs which joined exploration activity in different parts of Arabika, resulted in the discovery of many deep caves including five caves deeper than 1,000 m.
 
They broke through an impassable squeeze at −120 m in Genrikhova Bezdna Cave and eventually connected it to Kuybyshevskaya at −956 m in 1987. The resultant system has been named the Arabikskaya System.
 
From 1982 onwards, the Kyiv cavers started systematically working in Krubera Cave, located less than 200 metres from the Kuybyshevskaya entrance, hoping to connect with the Arabikskaya System and increase its total depth by 60 m. Exploration progressed slowly because critically tight meanders between the pits required enormous amounts of work to widen them to a passable size. The cave was pushed to −340 m during 1982–1987. Two "windows" in a vertical shaft at depths of 220–250 m were documented on the cave map but remained unexplored. During this time the cave received its second, alternative name  (Crows') Cave, owing to the number of crows nesting in the entrance shaft.

1990s–early 2000s 
The political and ethnic conflict in Abkhazia during 1992–94 resulted in instability and border problems which continued over subsequent years. This suspended speleological explorations in Arabika. Some stabilization of the situation in 1998 has since enabled a renewal of exploration effort to take place in the region.
 
In 1999, the expedition of the Ukrainian Speleological Associations (Ukr. S.A.) led by Jurij Kasjan (also spelled Yuriy Kasyan) made a major breakthrough in Krubera Cave by discovering and exploring two branches behind the windows at a depth of 220–250 m. These branches stretched in two different directions. The "Main Branch" was explored to −740 m and the "Nekuybyshevskaya Branch" to −500 m.
 
In 2000, the Main Branch was quickly pushed by the multi-stage expedition of the Ukr. S.A. in August to −1,200 m and in September to −1,410 m.
 
In January 2001, the Ukr.S.A. expedition explored the cave to  making it the deepest cave in the world. For the first time in the history of speleology, the deepest cave in the world had been established outside of western Europe. Since 2001, the Krubera explorations by the Ukr.S.A. have been undertaken within the frame of the multi-year project named "The Call of the Abyss", coordinated by A. Klimchouk, Y. Kasyan, G. Samokhin and K. Markovskoy. Besides the Ukrainian speleologists, cavers from many countries such as France, Spain, Russia, Moldova, Bulgaria, United Kingdom, Ireland, Israel and Lithuania have taken part in different expeditions of the Ukr.S.A.

2001 onwards 
The major events in the exploration of Krubera Cave in subsequent years were as follows (see Figure 4 for spot locations):

2001 
 August: the Ukr.S.A. expedition led by Jurij Kasjan. Four underground camps established in the cave: in the Main Branch at −500, −1,200 and −1,400 m and in the Nekujbyshevskaja Branch at −500 m. Systematic inspection and probing of potential leads in the deep sections of the Main Branch; climbing in the Lamprechtsofen tributary; digging in the boulder choke in the Nekuybyshevskaya Branch.

2003 
 August: the expedition of the Kyiv Speleological Club and the CAVEX team. Tested and passed a sump at −1,440 m (now known as Sump 1), explored the post-sump section to roughly −1,660 m, continued climbing in the Lamprechtsofen tributary.

2004 
 July: the CAVEX team started their separate explorations, beyond the Ukr.S.A. project, in Krubera Cave. Continued exploring a section beyond Sump 1 at −1,410 m and reached the next sump (Sump 2 – "Blue Lake") at depth claimed to be −1,840 m. The depth of that point according to the subsequent Ukr.S.A. survey is −1,775 m.
 August: the Ukr.S.A. expedition led by Nikolay Solovyov and Alexander Klimchouk. In the Main Branch, surveyed the post-sump series, established a camp at −1,640 m, discovered a lead to a new section ("The Way to the Dream") and explored to −1,840 m. Explored the Uzhgorodskaya Series in the upper part of Krubera by climbing an 80 m high shaft in the Meander Krym. Continued working in the Nekuybyshevskaya Branch.
 October: the Ukr.S.A. expedition led by Jurij Kasjan. In the Main Branch, discovered a lead into a new section beyond the Big Junction at −1,790 m. Explored this section named "Windows" to a blind chamber called "Game Over" at −2,080 m. The depth mark of 2,000 m had been passed for the first time in the history of speleology.

2005 
 February–March: the Ukr. S.A. expedition led by Jurij Kasjan. In the Main Branch, continued exploring the "Windows" series where many side leads and several sumps were tested. A sump at −1,980 m called "Kvitochka" was passed by Nikolay Solovyov, and a continuation found behind it.
 July: the CAVEX team expedition. Explored the section beyond the Kvitochka Sump to a further sump called Dva Kapitana ("Two Captains") at −2,140 m.
 August: the Ukr. S.A. expedition led by Nikolay Solovyov. Continued digging and broke through the boulder choke at −500 m in the Nekuybyshevskaya Branch, explored it to the next boulder choke at −640 m.
 October: the Ukr.S.A. expedition led by Jurij Kasjan. The exploration beyond the Kvitochka Sump had been cancelled due to a sudden flood. Established a camp at −1,960 m. Performed a verification survey to −1,200 m by hydrolevelling to assess the precision of the standard Ukr.S.A. survey (the Russian Geographic Society group). Continued climbing in the Lamprechtsofen tributary to +210 m relative to the junction.

2006 
 August–September: the Ukr.S.A. expedition coordinated by Jurij Kasjan. In the Nekuybyshevskaya Branch, a group led by Kyryl Markovskoy broke through the boulder choke at −640 m and explored a continuation to −1,004 m.

2007 
 January: the CAVEX team expedition. Performed a dive in the terminal "Dva Kapitana" sump and claimed it to reach −30 m depth below the water table. However, characteristics of morphology of the underwater passage reported by the team were not confirmed by the subsequent exploration, and no safety line was found deeper than 16 m.
 August–September: the Ukr.S.A. expedition led by Jurij Kasjan. After an elbow at -35 m the underwater passage continues to depth under steep angle. Also in the deep parts of the Main Branch, several side passages and sumps at various depths were explored. In a side branch which previously ended at −1,775 m by the "Blue Lake" sump, a series of air-filled passages was explored behind the sump, separated by six intermediary sumps. The farthest sump, "Yantarny", was explored for 130 m in length and 19.5 m in depth and continues. The deepest point in this branch has been reached at −1,841 m. In the Nekuybyshevskaya Branch, a group led by Kyryl Markovskoy continued exploring new leads and extended the depth of this branch to −1,293 m.

2008 
 September: the Ukr.S.A. expedition led by Jurij Kasjan.

2009 
The international "Towards the Centre of the Earth" expedition led by Aidas Gudaitis returned to the main branch to collect data from water level loggers, swap their locations and push exploration in the "Spanish branch" near camp 1400. 2008–2009 data collected from 1,710 m and 1,800 m indicated that the sump levels rose in two distinct periods: continuously from May–July 2009 and with an isolated pulse in October 2008, both sumps reaching a maximum flood depth of 12 m. New logger locations at depths of 1,800 m, 1,980 m (Kvitochka sump) and 2,140 m (Dva Kapitana's sump).

2010 
 July–August: The CAVEX Team Summer expedition led by Konstantin Mujin performed the first biospeleological studies in the Krubera-Voronya cave. The biospeleological studies led by the cave biologists Ana Sofia Reboleira and Alberto Sendra, provided the deepest subterranean arthropods of the Earth.
Data logging devices were installed by Irish members of the expedition near to the entrance of the cave, to log surface conditions and enable correlation of data between surface and underground locations. "Spanish Branch" exploration was completed and a limit was reached with 131 m total passage surveyed.

2012 
 August:  A team of 59 spent 27 days exploring Krubera. Including members from nine different countries, the team set up a series of camps underground.

See also 
 Geography of Abkhazia
 Geography of Georgia
 List of caves
 Speleology
 List of deepest caves

Notes

References

Bibliography 
 Buachidze, I.M., and Meliva, A.M. 1967. To the question of groundwater discharge into the Black Sea in the Gagra area. Trudy laboratorii gidrogeologii I inzhenernoy geologii Gruzinskogo politechnicheskogo instituta, 3, 33–39.
 Kiknadze, T. Z. 1972. Karst of the Arabika massif. Metzniereba, Tbilisi, 245 p. (in Russian).
 Kiknadze, T.Z. 1979. Geology, Hydrogeology and activity of limestone karst. Metzniereba, Tbilisi, 232 p. (in Russian).
 Klimchouk, A. B. 1984. On impact of the late Quaternary glaciations on the karst development of the Arabika massif (Caucasus). Izvestia VGO (Leningrad), 116 (2), 165¬–170 (in Russian).
 Klimchouk, A. B. 1990. Karst circulation systems of the Arabika massif. Peschery (Caves), inter-university scientific transactions, Perm: Perm University, 6–16 (in Russian)
 Klimchouk, A.B. 2006. The deepest cave in the world in the Arabika Massif and the evolution of the Black Sea. Svet (Light), 2 (31), 33–36 (in Russian).
 Klimchouk, A. 1991. Le grotte del massiccio di Arabika. La Rivista del CAI, 112(1), 37–47.
 Klimchouk, A.B. 2004. Krubera (Voronja) Cave, Georgia. In: Gunn, J. (Ed.). Encyclopedia of Cave and Karst Science. New York - London: Fitzroy Dearborn – Taylor and Francis Books.
 Klimchouk, A. and Kasjan, Yu. 2001. In a search for the route to 2000 meters depth: The deepest cave in the World in the Arabika massif, Western Caucasus. Nat. Speleol. Soc. News (USA), 59 (9). 252–257.
 Klimchouk, A. and Kasjan, Yu. 2004. Krubera: il piu profondo abisso del mondo (Alla ricerca del −2000 metri nel massiccio di Arabika). La Rivista del CAI, 71–75.
 Klimchouk A.B. and Kasjan Yu.M. 2006. Distribution of temperature in karst systems: data from deep caves of the Arabika Massif. Geologichny Zhurnal (Geological Journal), 1, 108–115, Kyiv (Ukraine) (in Russian).
 Klimchouk, A.B., Samokhin, G.V., and Kasjan Yu.M. 2008. The deepest cave in the word Krubera and its hydrogeological and paleogeographic significance. Speleology and Karstology, 1, 100–104. Simferopol (Ukraine) (in Russian).
 Kruber, A. A. 1911. Karabi-Yuajla and the Arabika massif. Zemlevedenie (Moscow), 18(3) (in Russian).
 Kruber, A. A. 1912a. The voyage to Arabika. Estestvoznanie i geografia (in Russian).
 Kruber, A. A. 1912b. From observations of karst in the vicinity of Gagra and Karabi-Yuajla. Zemlevedenie (Moscow), 19 (1–2) (in Russian).
 Martel, E. A. 1909. La Côte d’Azur Russe (Riviera du Caucase). Ch. XVI: La massif de l'Arabika, Paris.
 Maruashvili, L. I., Tintilozov, Z. K., and Changashvili, G. Z. 1961. The results of speleological explorations carried out in 1960 on the Arabika limestone massif. Izvestia AN GSSR (Tbilisi), XXVI (5) (in Russian).
 Maruashvili, L. I., Tintilozov, Z. K., and Changashvili, G. Z. 1962. Karst and ancient glaciation in Arabika. Abstracts of papers of the second scientific session of speleologists. Tbilisi: AN GSSR (in Russian).
 Maruashvili, L. I., and Tintilozov, Z. K. 1963. The results of the recent speleological explorations in the karstic belt of the Western Georgia in 1957–1960. Zemlevedenie (Moscow), nov. ser. VI (in Russian).
 Sendra, Alberto and Ana Sofia P.S. Reboleira. 2012. The world's deepest subterranean community - Krubera-Voronja Cave (Western Caucasus). International Journal of Speleology, 41 (2): 221–230.
 Tabor, James M. Blind Descent. The Quest to Discover the Deepest Place on Earth. New York: Random House, 2010.

External links 

 Krubera Cave: The First 2000m+ Deep Cave on Earth; Chronicle of Exploration
 History of Exploration in the Arabica Massif
The 3D model of Krubera Cave
 BBC coverage of the discovery
 International Journal of Speleology - The world’s deepest subterranean community - Krubera-Voronja Cave
 New Species Discovered in World's Deepest Cave
 
Caves of Abkhazia
Limestone caves
Wild caves
Gagra District